Ahmed Nazir (born 1934) is a Pakistani former swimmer. He competed in the men's 100 metre backstroke at the 1956 Summer Olympics.

References

1934 births
Living people
Pakistani male swimmers
Olympic swimmers of Pakistan
Swimmers at the 1956 Summer Olympics
Place of birth missing (living people)
Male backstroke swimmers